Bonanni is an Italian surname. Notable people with the surname include:

Bret Bonanni (born 1994), American water polo player
Filippo Bonanni (1638–1723), Italian Jesuit scholar and conchologist
Laudomia Bonanni (1907–2002), Italian writer and journalist
Mariángela Bonanni (born 1988), Venezuelan beauty pageant winner
Massimo Bonanni (born 1982), Italian footballer
Raffaele Bonanni (born 1949), Italian trade unionist

Italian-language surnames